Dayon Ninkovic (born March 20, 1976) is a Serbian-American former professional basketball player.

College career 
Ninkovic played college basketball at Bowling Green and UW–Parkside. As a senior with the Rangers, he received a Great Lakes Valley Conference honorable mention for the 1997–98 season.

Professional career 
During his playing days as a both power forward and center, Ninkovic played for Crvena zvezda (Yugoslavia), Évreux Athletic and Vichy-Clermont in France, than in Portugal for Leiria, Portugal Telecom, and CAB Madeira, in France for Aix Maurienne, Entente Orléanaise Loiret, and Golbey-Épinal, and in Mexico for Venados de Mazatlán.

References

External links
Dayon Ninkovic at sports-reference.com
Dayon Ninkovic at proballers.com
Player Profile at eurobasket.com
Dayon Ninkovic at fibaeurope.com

1976 births
Living people
Aix Maurienne Savoie Basket players
American expatriate basketball people in Greece
American expatriate basketball people in France
American expatriate basketball people in Mexico
American expatriate basketball people in Portugal
American expatriate basketball people in Serbia
American expatriate basketball people in Switzerland
American men's basketball players
American people of Serbian descent
Basketball players from Milwaukee
CAB Madeira players
Centers (basketball)
Bowling Green Falcons men's basketball players
JA Vichy-Clermont Métropole players
KK Crvena zvezda players
Orléans Loiret Basket players
Power forwards (basketball)
Wisconsin–Parkside Rangers men's basketball players